North Killingholme Haven is a water outlet on the south bank of the Humber Estuary in the civil parish of North Killingholme, to the north-west of the Port of Immingham.

The area was used at the beginning of the 20th century for clay extraction with a jetty transhipping clay to Hull; in 1912 construction  of a jetty for the Admiralty was consented, for fuel oil shipment. During the First World War a large seaplane facility was operated, known as RNAS Killingholme.

In the 1990s a Simon Group established a Roll on-Roll off river terminal at the Haven, known as Humber Sea Terminal; the terminal was expanded to six berths through the 1990s and 2000s.

History

At the end of the 19th century North Killingholme Haven was used as a drainage point for networks of drainage canals in the fields in the North Killingholme area – the outfall of the waterway onto the Humber was sluiced. There was a single dwelling at the outfall – the New Inn.

Between 1909 and 1913 Earles Cement works in Wilmington was supplied with clay from pits at North Killingholme, shipped by barge. Clay dug by hand, and transported by horse, later steam winch and then narrow gauge  locomotive to a jetty  at the mouth of Killingholme Haven.  The disused clay pits are since flooded and now form a saline lagoon habitat, with some scarce birds and invertebrates.

The jetty was receiving oil by the mid 1910s. An act of 1931, the North Killingholme Admiralty Pier Act (1931) allowed the extension of the existing pier's head, replacing two sunken ships which had been used as dolphins at the head of the pier. The station soon became an important refuelling point for the Royal Navy. The oil storage site was served by the Killingholme Admiralty Platform station from 1930 to 1963.

Another act of 1912, the "North Killingholme Pier Act" sanctioned a commercial pier to be constructed by the Yorkshire Transport Company. (unbuilt)

Adjacent to the Admiralty oil depot an seaplane station was opened in August 1914. Originally called RNAS Immingham it was renamed as RNAS Killingholme. By late 1914 Facilities at the site included a  hangar and four  seaplane hangars, as well as a  slipway for the seaplanes. Facilities were increased during the First World War, including larger hangars and further slipways-  with staff levels reaching 900 operating over 100 aeroplanes, one of the main seaplane bases in the UK. The facility was disbanded after the end of the war- some of the hangars were used to construct a bus depot in Grimsby (Victoria Street).

The riverside at and around North Killingholme Haven has been identified as a viable expansion point for further port facilities  on the south bank of the Humber – an £80 million port was proposed in the 1980s but not proceeded with – a report by Coopers and Lybrand in the same period identified demand for both Roll-on/Roll-off and containerised handling facilities in the area. Later in the 1990s Ro-Ro facilities were established by Simon Group (see § Humber Sea Terminal).

The haven is currently (2015) used  by dredging contractors Humber Work Boats Ltd..

Humber Sea Terminal (2000–present)

In the late 1994 Simon Group gained a statutory instrument enabling it to construct a jetty at Killingholme North Haven. The development was to be a deepwater roll-on/roll-off terminal aimed at container traffic from European ports such as Rotterdam. A tender in 1998 from Edmund Nuttall and consultants Posford Duvivier led to a contract in 1999. The works included a  two berth jetty supported on fifty  tubular steel piles with a concrete deck; a cellular concrete pontoon  secured by two restraining dolphins consisting of outer and inner tubular steel piles of  ring filled with concrete; and a  pier linking to land also on  piles, connected to the pontoon by an  bridge. Shoreside construction was contracted to Clark Construction.

The two berth "Phase I" opened June 2000, with Stena Line sailing to Hook of Holland.

The facility's capacity of 14 sailings per week was soon reached, and in 2002 the developer, Simon Group began planning for a "Phase Two", with two further berths. The initial plan was for a third Ro-Ro berth from the original pontoon, plus a fourth berth for Load-on/Load-off (Lo-Lo) use, connection to the original land pier by a new spur. The "Phase Two" of the development was consented (2003); A £9.6 million contract for the third berth was awarded in 2003 to Edmund Nuttall, with the work including a new  jetty, as well as approach bridge and adjustable ramp.

The fourth berth was re-designed to be either a Lo-Lo or Ro-Ro berth, and was constructed as a Ro-Ro facility with Belgian shipper Cobelfret signing a twenty-year agreement. Nuttall was selected as contractor for the £8 million fourth berth contract, including the approach bridge spur;  linkspan; and additional  cellular steel pontoon. The approach spur was begun in May 2003.

For phase 2 an additional £14.5 million was expended on onshore storage groundworks, covering .

Kia Motors relocated its import activities to a  vehicle import centre served by the port , in association with ABLE UK and the port operators.

By late 2005 clients included Stena Line, Colbefret, UECC, Norfolkline, Ferryways and Eukor. Planning for a third phase of the terminal, initially estimated as costing £25 million for two further berths was underway in 2005. A harbour revision order allowing a new jetty, pier and link bridge was enacted in 2006.

As of 2012 the terminal was owned by C.RO nv as subsidiary C.RO Ports Killingholme Ltd.. The port had 6 ro-ro  berths;  of port land for development; with facilities include a Pre-Delivery Inspection centre for cars, and a rail connection.

References

Sources

External links

History of Lincolnshire
Economy of Lincolnshire
Ports and harbours of Lincolnshire
Ports and harbours of the Humber